Lake San Antonio is a lake located primarily in southern Monterey County, California, and partially in northern San Luis Obispo County, California. The lake is formed by San Antonio Dam on the San Antonio River. The dam is 202 feet (62 m) tall and was completed in 1965 under Monterey County District Engineer Loran Bunte Jr . The lake and dam are owned by the Monterey County Water Authority.

Lake San Antonio's primary purpose is to provide groundwater. Without the lake, the San Antonio River would be nearly dry in the summer months. With water in the river year-round, more of it can seep into the ground.

Most of the lake has dried in recent years. The 2014 Wildflower Triathlon had to accommodate the extremely low water level by moving the swim portion two miles from where it is traditionally held. Participants that year had to run along the former lake bed to get to their bike transition area. In June 2015, the Monterey County Board of Supervisors announced it would close the camping and other facilities at Lake San Antonio effective 1 July 2015, due to costs and falling attendance.

Area activities
Boating, waterskiing, fishing and camping are popular recreational activities at the lake, particularly in the summer. Visitors can bring their own boats or rent them at the lake. Horseback riding and mountain biking are also popular; the south shore of Lake San Antonio has 26 miles of trails.

The California Office of Environmental Health Hazard Assessment (OEHHA) has developed a safe eating advisory for Lake San Antonio based on levels of mercury or PCBs found in fish caught from this water body.

Camping
Lake San Antonio has over 500 campsites. Many campsites have RV hookups. Sites are available both directly on the north shore and on the south shore of the lake, as well as in the more forested areas a short walk away. The North Shore of Lake San Antonio is unique, as it is one of the few lakes in California that permits shoreline camping on the water's edge.  Because of this, it has grown in popularity with boaters, who are allowed to keep their vessel in the water by their campsite.  There is ample shoreline camping at North Shore.  Most campers prefer North Shore over Lake Nacimiento (Located 9 miles south) because of the much larger campsites, and ability to camp on the water's edge.

Wildlife
Deer frequent the campsites, even lounging around near campsites during daylight hours. Other wildlife that may be spotted include mountain lions, snakes, wild pigs, racoons, bobcats, and badgers. Eagles frequent the lake and tours are offered during select months.

Bald eagles

Lake San Antonio is a popular winter habitat for the bald eagle, the national symbol of the United States. Monterey County Parks provides tours in January and February for visitors interested in viewing the bald eagle in its native habitat. Tours must be reserved in advance, as they often sell out weeks before they take place.

Wildflower Triathlon
Lake San Antonio is the site of the annual Wildflower Triathlon, one of the largest triathlon events in the world. The "Long Course", a half-Ironman, is considered to be especially grueling.

Falling Lake Levels and Closure
Beginning in summer 2013, the water level at Lake San Antonio fell dramatically. The initial drop occurred during emergency repairs on the Lake Nacimiento Dam - Lake San Antonio water was used to sustain the flow of the river below the dam. The problem was exacerbated by the ongoing drought in the region. With lake facilities such as the boat ramp no longer usable, attendance fell sharply (from over 250,000 visitors per year to under 100,000 in 2014). Due to lower revenues and high costs to maintain the facilities, the Monterey County Board of Supervisors opted to close the lake effective 1 July 2015 for the remainder of the summer season.  Starting in October 2017, the south shore resort area was to open only on weekends, and the north shore area was to be closed, until Memorial Day weekend 2018

See also
List of dams and reservoirs in California
List of lakes in California
List of largest reservoirs of California

References

External links
Lake San Antonio official information from Monterey County Parks
Cal Dept of Water:Lake San Antonio monthly water level

San Antonio, Lake
San Antonio, Lake
Campgrounds in California
Parks in Monterey County, California
Salinas River (California)
Santa Lucia Range
San Antonio, Lake
San Antonio